The 2016–17 Ligue 1 season is the top level of football competition in Niger. It began on 4 December 2016 and concluded on 25 June 2017.

Standings
  1.AS FAN (Niamey)                   26  15  7  4  47-21  52  Champions
  2.US Gendarmerie Nationale (Niamey) 26  15  1 10  36-24  46
  3.AS Douanes (Niamey)               26  13  5  8  46-26  44
  4.AS GNN (Niamey)                   26  11  7  8  38-19  40
  5.AS Police (Niamey)                26  10  9  7  30-29  39
  6.Sahel SC (Niamey)                 26   9  9  8  30-29  36
  7.Olympic FC (Niamey)               26   9  9  8  22-26  36
  8.AS SONIDEP (Niamey)               26   8 11  7  22-20  35
  9.ASN NIGELEC (Niamey)              26   9  8  9  19-25  35
 10.Urana FC (Arlit)                  26   8  9  9  15-18  33
 11.Jangorzo FC (Maradi)              26   8  6 12  31-37  30
 12.Akokana FC (Arlit)                26   7  8 11  24-26  29
 ------------------------------------------------------------
 13.AS Racing FC de Boukoki (Niamey)  26   4 12 10  19-33  24  Relegation Playoff
 ------------------------------------------------------------
 14.Tagour Provincial Club (Dosso)    26   5  1 20  17-63  16  Relegated

References

Super Ligue (Niger) seasons
Premier League
Premier League
Niger